Lloyd Joel Andrews Sr. (August 26, 1920 – October 7, 2014) was an American educator, businessman, and politician.

Born in Dutton, Montana, Andrews moved with his parents to a farm in Green Bluff, Washington. He graduated from Mead High School and then graduated from Washington State University. Andrews served in the United States Navy during World War II. Andrews served in the Washington State Senate from 1953 to 1957 as a Republican. From 1957 to 1961, Andrew served as Washington State Superintendent of Public Instruction. In 1960, Andrews ran for the office of Governor of Washington and lost the general election to incumbent Albert D. Rosellini. Then, in 1964, Andrews ran for the United States Senate and lost the election. He was the owner of ChemNuclear. Andrews died in Scottsdale, Arizona.

References

1920 births
2014 deaths
People from Teton County, Montana
People from Spokane County, Washington
Military personnel from Montana
Washington State University alumni
Businesspeople from Washington (state)
Washington (state) Superintendents of Public Instruction
Republican Party Washington (state) state senators
20th-century American businesspeople